The men's 800 metres event at the 1992 World Junior Championships in Athletics was held in Seoul, Korea, at Olympic Stadium on 16, 17 and 19 September.

Medalists

Results

Final
19 September

Semifinals
17 September

Semifinal 1

Semifinal 2

Semifinal 3

Heats
16 September

Heat 1

Heat 2

Heat 3

Heat 4

Heat 5

Participation
According to an unofficial count, 34 athletes from 28 countries participated in the event.

References

800 metres
800 metres at the World Athletics U20 Championships